Slechtvalk (the Dutch word for peregrine falcon) is a Christian black metal band from the Netherlands, formed in 1999. Previously signed to Fear Dark Records and currently to Whirlwind Records, the group has released five albums, a split-CD with Kekal, a single and a DVD. Their second album, The War That Plagues the Lands, reached No. 2 at Lowland's Top 50 Metal Charts. Their third album, At the Dawn of War, coincided with the release of a live-DVD, Upon the Fields of Battle, a maxi single for "Thunder of War", and was named one of HM Magazine "100 best Christian metal albums of all time". The band's fifth album, Where Wandering Shadows and Mists Collide, was released on December 20, 2016.

History

Slechtvalk began as a solo project in 1997 by singer/guitarist Shamgar, formerly of Ascension and Mordax. The project was first called Dommer (1999–2000), before Shamgar finally settled on Slechtvalk. The debut album, Falconry, was released in 2000 by the now-defunct Dutch label Fear Dark which had bands such as Eluveitie, Royal Anguish, Taketh and Kekal on its roster.

Falconry was received positively, and Dutch metal magazines such as Aardschok interviewed Shamgar. As a result of this exposure, Shamgar was in the position to form a band, and was joined by soprano singer Fionnghuala, folk singer and rhythm guitarist Ohtar (also with Dutch folk metal band Heidevolk), bassist Nath, drummer Grimbold, keyboardist Sorgier, and dancer Meallá.

In 2002, Slechtvalk released their second full-length album, The War That Plagues the Lands. As a teaser they first released a split CD with Kekal from Indonesia (also signed on Fear Dark); each band recorded four songs and a cover (Slechtvalk covered Antestor's "Kongsblod", from The Return of the Black Death). The War That Plagues the Lands was well received.

In 2005, the band released their third album, At the Dawn of War, with a more symphonic sound and elements of folk metal. The band also incorporated more war and fantasy themes to their live shows and began dressing in medieval warrior costumes. That same year Slechtvalk released a live DVD, Upon the Fields of Battle, filmed at the club Hedon Zwolle; a music video for "Thunder of War" (also released as a maxi single) received some airplay at local music channels. The band toured several European countries with Frosthardr. In 2010, HM Magazine listed At the Dawn of War as number 60 on its "100 best Christian metal albums of all time".

During early 2006 the band was joined by Grimbold's brother Seraph as a guitarist, as Ohtar was not able to continue playing the guitars due to a chronic wrist injury. In July 2006, Fionnghuala left the group to focus on her classical music career. Slechtvalk began writing new material and announced that the music would take a more technical and brutal approach.

In February 2007, the bassist Nath was removed from the line-up: Ohtar, who was able to play again, picked up on bass. In late 2007, keyboard-player Hydrith announced his departure to focus more on his family. Since then, Slechtvalk performed without keyboards (playing their more extreme songs) or with session-musicians.

On April 2009, the band signed with German-based Whirlwind Records. An Era of Bloodshed, a compilation album of the band's past material, with two unreleased promotional songs, was released in October 2009, Whirlwind. Nath—now known as Premnath—re-joined the band as a keyboard-player. The band did a European tour to promote the new album. The tour came to life through financial support from fans, for which the band asked via SellaBand.com.
The band went to Sweden's Studio Mega in late 2009 with producer Johan "the ant" Örnborg to record their fourth full-length album titled A Forlorn Throne. It was mixed and mastered by Jens Bogren at Fascination Street, and the cover artwork as well as a new logo was designed by Raymond Swanland.

In 2014, the band released pre-orders for their upcoming album. After that there was no more information until 2016, when the band released a lyric video for the new song "We Are", announcing the album, Where Wandering Shadows and Mists Collide, would be released on December 20.

Festivals
In addition to local shows in the Netherlands, Slechtvalk has appeared at several heavy metal music festivals such as Elements of Rock in Switzerland, Bobfest in Sweden, Nordic Fest in Norway, and Interregnum Fest in Germany.

Lineup

Current members
Shamgar (Mark Geertsema) – lead vocals, guitar (2000–present), bass, drums, keyboards (2000-2002)
Seraph (Jos Lucas) – guitar (2010–present)
Tomrair (Cullen Toner) - bass (2022-present)
Ohtar (Jesse Vuerbaert) – vocals (2011–present), guitar, backing vocals (2002-2011) (does not tour)
Premnath (Premnath Gonesh) – keyboards (2010–present), bass (2002-2010)
Hamar(Joël de Jong) – drums (2017–present)

Former members
Hydrith – keyboards (2003-2007)
Fionnghuala – soprano (2002-2010)
Sorgier – keyboards (2002-2003)
Dagor (Nick van Liempd) – bass (2011–2021)
Grimbold (Jan-Paul Lucas) – drums, backing vocals (2002-2017)

Timeline

Discography
Falconry (2000)
The War That Plagues the Lands (2002)
At the Dawn of War (2005)
A Forlorn Throne (2010)
Where Wandering Shadows and Mists Collide (2016)

Other releases
Chaos & Warfare (split-CD with Kekal, 2002 Fear Dark Records)
Upon the Fields of Battle (DVD, 2005 Fear Dark Records)
Thunder of War (CD-single, 2005 Fear Dark Records)
An Era of Bloodshed (compilation album, 2009)
We Are (single, 2016)

References

External links

  

Christian extreme metal groups
Dutch black metal musical groups
Musical groups established in 1999
Unblack metal musical groups
Viking metal musical groups
1999 establishments in the Netherlands